Joshua’s Law is a Georgia state law enacted in 2007 changing the driver's license requirements for teen drivers. A teen driver must meet the new requirements to obtain a Georgia driver’s license. The law was named after Joshua Brown, who died in an accident in 2003. Joshua’s parents joined with legislators in an effort to put stronger driver training laws into effect. The end result was The Teenage and Adult Driver Responsibility Act (TADRA), a law that requires teens get specific driving experience and instruction before obtaining licensing beyond the learner's permit.  The law also implemented a graduated driver licensing system, imposing time-of-day and passenger restrictions on drivers aged 16 and 17.

Licensing procedure
TADRA, enacted on July 1, 1997, necessitates a graduated three step driver licensing procedure for Georgia teens between the ages of 15 and 18. There are three separate classifications for teen driver licensing. Joshua’s Law, which went into effect January 1, 2007, added an additional educational requirement to the second step.

Step 1, the Learner's permit (Class CP license). Can operate a Class C vehicle when accompanied by a person at least 21 years of age who is licensed to drive a class C vehicle, who is fit and capable of exercising control over the vehicle, and who is occupying a seat beside the driver.

Step 2, the Intermediate license (Class D license). Drivers are 16 years of age, who have held an Instructional Permit for 12 months and 1 day and passed the state-administered comprehensive on-road driving test are eligible for this license. There are several restrictions on this license, which are:  
No driving between the hours of 12am and 5am.
For the first six months, the only passengers allowed in the vehicle are immediate family members and spouses.

For the second six months the driver is allowed to carry passengers who are not immediate family members, as long as no more than one of those passengers is under 21 years of age.
After the second six months the driver is allowed up to three such passengers (persons under 21 who are not members of the driver's immediate family).
Joshua's Law - On or after January 1, 2007, any 16 year old who obtains an initial Class D license must have completed:
 a driver education course approved by the Department of Driver Services and
 a cumulative total of at least forty (40) hours of other supervised driving experience, including at least six (6) hours at night.

Step 3, the Full license (Class C license). The Class C license is granted to drivers ages 18 years and older who have a class D license and have no major traffic convictions during the previous 12 months. Major traffic violations are as follows:

DUI 
Eluding a police officer 
Drag racing 
Reckless driving 
Hit and run 
Any violation that assesses four or more points on the driver's license

Other provisions
Joshua's Law also implemented additional fees on certain traffic offenses such as DUIs. The program raises approximately $2 to $4 million per year in revenue for the State of Georgia.

References

External links
Georgia Department of Driver Services Official Website
Georgia Teen Driver Education Official Website
The Joshua Brown Foundation (Official Facebook Page)

Georgia (U.S. state) statutes
2007 in American law
2007 in Georgia (U.S. state)
Driving licences